Oļegs Mihailovs (born 23 August 1999) is an international speedway rider from Latvia.

Speedway career 
Mihailovs won two bronze and one silver medal at the Latvian Individual Speedway Championship in 2017, 2018 and 2020 respectively. He qualified for the 2021 Speedway Grand Prix

References 

Living people
1999 births
Latvian speedway riders